The Dunderberg Shale is a geologic formation in Nevada and Utah.

It preserves fossils dating back to the Cambrian period.

See also

 List of fossiliferous stratigraphic units in Nevada
 List of fossiliferous stratigraphic units in Utah
 Paleontology in Nevada
 Paleontology in Utah

References

External links

Cambrian Nevada
Cambrian geology of Utah
Shale formations of the United States
Cambrian System of North America
Cambrian southern paleotropical deposits